International Superstar Soccer, known as  in Japan, is a football video game developed by Konami for the Super Nintendo Entertainment System. It is the first title in the International Superstar Soccer (ISS) series of sports video games.

Content

Game modes
Open Game: A simple friendly match, that can be played against the CPU, another player, or just watched as the CPU controls both teams.
International Cup: A mode that emulates the FIFA World Cup, (which had qualifying round. where teams are distributed in six groups of four that year), teams each. The best 16 in this stage qualify to the knockout stage until the champion is known.
World Series: A league competition where all teams play against each other in a round-robin system.
Training: A series of challenges in different respects (dribbling, passing, shooting to the goal, defending and corner kick taking, in order), where the player must complete these challenges successfully under the established time, with the goal to sharpening the player's abilities.
Scenario: Enables the player to select one among nine matches running their courses, in order to achieve victory before time runs out (all matches start during the second half, and the player's team may be losing or tied). A draw results in failure.
Penalty Kick: A simple penalty kick match. Each team takes five shots alternately and, if there is no winner after these shots, they go into a sudden death round.

The game uses a password system in order to save and load International Cup and World Series Euro Cup matches.

Teams 
There are 26 national teams and a secret team. These are the teams that appear in both versions, in the order they appear in the team selection screen.

  Italy
  Germany
  South Korea
  Cameroon
  Nigeria
  United States
  Mexico
  Colombia
  Brazil
  Argentina
  Bulgaria
  Romania
  Belgium
  Sweden
  Ireland
  France
  England
  Spain
  Netherlands
 Super Star Team

These are the teams that appear only in the USA/EUR version:
  Russia
  Switzerland
  Austria
  Norway
  Denmark
  Wales
  Scotland

These are the teams that appear only in the JAP version (based in the AFC Final Round for the 1994 FIFA World Cup)
  Iraq
  Iran
  North Korea
  Saudi Arabia
  Japan

Reception
On release, Famicom Tsūshin scored the game a 29 out of 40. GamePro said it was "a runner-up to" FIFA International Soccer (1993) "among the best soccer games." The reviewer commented that, though it fails to dethrone FIFA International Soccer as the best soccer simulator for the SNES because of its less precise controls and weaker sounds, International Superstar Soccer is a solid game due to its detailed and "lifelike" graphics, numerous options, and particularly its training mode. The two sports reviewers of Electronic Gaming Monthly both gave it a 7 out of 10 rating. Similar to GamePro, they remarked that the controls are imperfect but praised the graphics and play options. One of the reviewers complained that the enjoyable play-by-play feature of the Japanese version was taken out of the North American release. A reviewer for Next Generation assessed that "Providing fast action, a reasonably good commentator and pretty good graphics, International Super Star Soccer is a solid effort if not exactly special." He gave it three out of five stars.

Next Generation reviewed the SNES version of the game, rating it three stars out of five, and stated that "the simple controls and plethora of season options outweigh the minor annoyances." 

IGN ranked International Superstar Soccer 64th on their "Top 100 SNES Games of All Time."  They praised the game calling it "An incredibly thorough, detailed and accurate conversion of its sport of choice."

Allejo 
Due to lack of licenses of FIFA, Konami created fictional names to represent real players. One of them is Allejo, modeled after Bebeto. Seen by some as a Brazilian meme, Allejo gained popularity as a skilled player capable of impossible moves and goals. He was pointed as national phenomenon and he's been actually considered one of the best Brazilian footballers of all times.

References

1994 video games
International Superstar Soccer
Super Nintendo Entertainment System games
Super Nintendo Entertainment System-only games
Video games developed in Japan
Video games with isometric graphics
Multiplayer and single-player video games